Organpipe Point is a prominent east–west trending headland rising to about 60 or 70 m on the northwest coast of Varna Peninsula, Livingston Island in the South Shetland Islands, Antarctica and forming the north side of the entrance to Charybdis Cove and the southwest side of the entrance to Griffin Cove.

The feature is descriptively named in association with the notable doleritic rock showing sub-vertical continuous columnar joints resembling organ pipes.

Location

Maps
 L.L. Ivanov et al. Antarctica: Livingston Island and Greenwich Island, South Shetland Islands. Scale 1:100000 topographic map. Sofia: Antarctic Place-names Commission of Bulgaria, 2005.
 L.L. Ivanov. Antarctica: Livingston Island and Greenwich, Robert, Snow and Smith Islands. Scale 1:120000 topographic map.  Troyan: Manfred Wörner Foundation, 2009.

References
Composite Antarctic Gazetteer.

Headlands of Livingston Island